Ahmed Ahmedov (Bulgarian: Ахмед Ахмедов; born 4 March 1995) is a Bulgarian professional footballer who plays as a striker for Slavia Sofia.

Career

Dunav Ruse
On 18 June 2018 Ahmedov signed a contract with the Bulgarian First League team Dunav Ruse, after spending 3 seasons in  OFC Pomorie. He made his professional debut for the team in the first league match of the season against Vitosha Bistritsa on 20 July 2018, scoring the only goal for Dunav.

Slavia Sofia
In June 2022 Ahmedov joined Slavia Sofia.

Honours

Club
Neftchi Baku
Azerbaijan Premier League: 2020–21

Career statistics

Club

References

External links
 

1995 births
Living people
Bulgarian footballers
Bulgaria youth international footballers
FC Pomorie players
FC Dunav Ruse players
PFC CSKA Sofia players
Neftçi PFK players
First Professional Football League (Bulgaria) players
Azerbaijan Premier League players
Association football defenders
People from Burgas Province
Bulgarian expatriate sportspeople in Azerbaijan
Bulgarian Turks